Berlin Express is a 1948 American drama film starring Robert Ryan, Merle Oberon and Paul Lukas, and directed by Jacques Tourneur.

Thrown together by chance, a group of people search a city for a kidnapped peace activist. Set in Allied-occupied Germany, it was shot on location in post-World War II Frankfurt-am-Main (with exterior and interior shots of the IG Farben Building and its paternoster elevators) and Berlin. During the opening credits, a full-screen notice reads, "Actual scenes in Frankfurt and Berlin were photographed by authorisation of the United States Army of Occupation, the British Army of Occupation, the Soviet Army of Occupation."

Plot
Various people board a U.S. Army train, the Main Seiner, to Frankfurt.

Dr. Bernhardt tries to become better acquainted with the other passengers, but they all rebuff his overtures because he is a German. When Sterling realises who he is, this immediately changes the atmosphere. After retiring to his compartment, Bernhardt is killed by a bomb. While the others are questioned at the next stop, Frankfurt, they learn that the dead man was actually one of the doctor's bodyguards. Bernhardt had been posing as another passenger, and Lucienne is his secretary.

Bernhardt's deception does not last long. He is kidnapped from the busy railway station in broad daylight after he greets Walther, an old, trusted friend. The U.S. Army quickly institutes a search of the city, but when Lucienne begs her fellow travelers to help look for Bernhardt, they at first all decline. One by one, however, they change their minds.

Lucienne suggests they go see Walther, unaware that he has betrayed Bernhardt in return for his missing wife's location. When they get there, they discover only Walther's body, as he has hanged himself after discovering his wife was dead all along.

The group splits up to cover the city. Lindley accompanies Lucienne to various illegal nightclubs. At the last one, Lindley notices a woman smoking an unusually long cigarette, just like the ones Bernhardt likes. He picks up a discarded butt and shows Lucienne that it has a "B" monogram on it. When the woman turns out to be an entertainer, pretending to know the answers of questions posed by the customers, Lindley asks her where Bernhardt is. Her clown assistant impedes Lindley, allowing her to get away. When Lindley and Lucienne question Sergeant Barnes, the American soldier who was sitting with the woman beforehand, he reluctantly agrees to lead them to where she lives.

When they get to an abandoned brewery, Barnes turns out to be working with the kidnappers. Now all three are prisoners. However, an undercover agent had knocked out the clown and taken his place, accompanying the others to the hideout. He is shot when the real clown shows up, but manages to get back to the nightclub and inform the authorities where Bernhardt is being held. American soldiers break in just as Bernhardt and Lucienne are about to be shot and free the three unharmed. Kessler, the ringleader, is killed by Perrot, who turns out to be Bernhardt's would-be assassin.

The passengers board the connecting Berliner 2 train for Berlin. Perrot suggests that each of them take a turn guarding Bernhardt in his compartment. Lindley pieces together various lies Perrot had told and recalls that he knew that the bomb was made from a grenade. The others dismiss his suspicions, but Lindley sees Perrot strangling Bernhardt in the reflection from a passing train and saves the doctor's life. Perrot is shot dead as he tries to flee.

Cast
 Merle Oberon as Lucienne
 Robert Ryan as Robert Lindley
 Charles Korvin as Perrot
 Paul Lukas as Dr. Bernhardt
 Robert Coote as Sterling
 Reinhold Schünzel as Walther
 Roman Toporow as Lt. Maxim
 Peter von Zerneck as Hans Schmidt
 Otto Waldis as Kessler
 Fritz Kortner as Franzen
 Michael Harvey as Sgt. Barnes
 Tom Keene as Major
 Charles McGraw as USFET Col. Johns
 Marle Hayden as Maja the Mind Reader
 Paul Stewart as Narrator (uncredited)

Production
According to Eddie Muller, a Turner Classic Movies host, Merle Oberon insisted on Lucien Ballard, her husband, being the cinematographer because he had developed techniques to hide the scars she had as a result of a car accident.

Muller also noted that this was the first Hollywood production filmed on location in post-war Berlin, beating out A Foreign Affair.

Reception
The staff at Variety magazine gave the film a positive review, and wrote, "[The m]ost striking feature of this production is its extraordinary background of war-ravaged Germany. With a documentary eye, this film etches a powerfully grim picture of life amidst the shambles. It makes awesome and exciting cinema...Ryan establishes himself as a first-rate actor in this film, demonstrating conclusively that his brilliant performance in Crossfire was no one-shot affair." Variety, however, did criticize the screenplay for "its failure to break away from the formula of anti-Nazi films."

The New York Times had a similar response, stating the film's photography of the post-war landscape creates a "realistic, awesome and impressive vista". After lukewarm praise for the film's plot, the reviewer continues, "...it is the panoramic and close views of life amid the 'new architecture' of Frankfort and Berlin — 'early Twentieth Century modern warfare' architecture — which gives the adventure the authentic impact of a documentary."

Harold Medford was nominated for the Writers Guild of America Award for the Screen, Best Written American Drama, 1949.

References

External links
 
 
 
 
 
 

1948 films
1940s thriller drama films
American thriller drama films
American black-and-white films
1940s English-language films
Film noir
Films directed by Jacques Tourneur
Films scored by Friedrich Hollaender
Films set in France
Films set in Frankfurt
Films set in Germany
Films set in Paris
Rail transport films
RKO Pictures films
1948 drama films
1940s American films